The 2010 IIHF World U18 Championships was the 12th edition of the IIHF World U18 Championship.  The tournament was held in Minsk and Babruysk, Belarus, between April 13 and April 23, 2010. Tournament games were played at the Minsk Sports Palace in Minsk and the Babruysk Arena in Babruysk.  The United States won the gold medal for the second consecutive year with a 3–1 victory over Sweden in the championship game.  The gold medal was the fifth for the United States since the tournament began in 1999; Sweden matched their best ever performance with a silver medal.

Top Division

Preliminary Round

Group A

Fixtures
The Group A games took place in Bobruisk, Belarus, between April 13 and April 18.

All times local.

Group B

Fixtures
The Group B games took place in Minsk, Belarus, between April 13 and April 18.

All times local.

Relegation round

Results
Note: The following matches from the preliminary round carry forward to the relegation round:
April 15, 2010:  11–3 
April 17, 2010:  4–3

Final round

Quarterfinals

Semifinals

Fifth place game

Bronze medal game

Gold medal game

Tournament awards
 Best players selected by the directorate
Best Goalkeeper: Jack Campbell 
Best Forward: Teemu Pulkkinen 
Best Defenseman: Adam Larsson

Scoring leaders
List shows the top skaters sorted by points, then goals.

GP = Games played; G = Goals; A = Assists; Pts = Points; +/− = Plus/minus; PIM = Penalties in minutes; POS = PositionSource: IIHF.com

Leading goaltenders
Only the top five goaltenders, based on save percentage, who have played 40% of their team's minutes are included in this list.
TOI = Time on ice (minutes:seconds); SA = Shots against; GA = Goals against; GAA = Goals against average; Sv% = Save percentage; SO = ShutoutsSource: IIHF.com

Final standings

Division I 

Group A was played in Herning, Denmark, between April 12 and April 18, 2010. Group B was played in Krynica-Zdrój, Poland, between April 11 and April 17, 2010.

Group A 

 was promoted to the Top Division for the 2011 IIHF World U18 Championships. was relegated to Division II for the 2011 IIHF World U18 Championships.

Group B 

 was promoted to the Top Division for the 2011 IIHF World U18 Championships. was relegated to Division II for the 2011 IIHF World U18 Championships.

Division II 

Group A was played in Narva, Estonia, between March 13 and March 19, 2010. Group B was played in Kyiv, Ukraine, between March 22 and March 28, 2010.

Group A 

 was promoted to Division I for the 2011 IIHF World U18 Championships. was relegated to Division III for the 2011 IIHF World U18 Championships.

Group B 

 was promoted to Division I for the 2011 IIHF World U18 Championships. is relegated to Division III for the 2011 IIHF World U18 Championships.

Division III 

Group A was played in Erzurum, Turkey, between March 8 and March 14, 2010. Group B was played in Monterrey, Mexico, between March 14 and March 20, 2010.

Group A 

 was promoted to Division II for the 2011 IIHF World U18 Championships.

Group B 

 was promoted to Division II for the 2011 IIHF World U18 Championships.

See also
 2010 IIHF World U18 Championship Division I
 2010 IIHF World U18 Championship Division II
 2010 IIHF World U18 Championship Division III
 2010 World Junior Ice Hockey Championships
 2010 World U-17 Hockey Challenge

References

External links
IIHF

 
IIHF World U18 Championships
IIHF World U18 Championships
World
2010
IIHF World U18
Babruysk
2010s in Minsk
Sports competitions in Minsk